UWW may refer to:
United World Wrestling, formerly known as the International Federation of Associated Wrestling Styles (FILA), the governing body of international amateur wrestling and grappling
University of Wisconsin–Whitewater, in Whitewater, Wisconsin